The Reresby Baronetcy, of Thribergh in the County of York, was a title in the Baronetage of England. It was created on 16 May 1642 for John Reresby. The second Baronet was a politician and diarist. The title became extinct on the death of the fourth Baronet in 1748.

Reresby baronets, of Thribergh (1642)
Sir John Reresby, 1st Baronet (1611–1646)
Sir John Reresby, 2nd Baronet (1634–1689)
Sir William Reresby, 3rd Baronet (1669–)
Sir Leonard Reresby, 4th Baronet (1679–1748)

References

Extinct baronetcies in the Baronetage of England